Noyelle-Vion is a commune in the Pas-de-Calais department in the Hauts-de-France region of France.

Geography

Population

Places of interest

 The eighteenth century church of Notre-Dame.
 The war memorial.
 A feudal motte and earthworks of a pre-Roman oppidum.

See also
Communes of the Pas-de-Calais department

References

Noyellevion